The Farman F.500 Monitor was a 1950s Franco-Belgian two-seat training aircraft.

Development
Farman had earlier produced the Stampe SV.4 under licence, and with the co-operation of Stampe designed a two-seat training monoplane using SV-4 components designated the Farman F.500. The prototype, named the Monitor I, first flew on 11 July 1952, it was a cantilever low-wing monoplane of mixed construction and conventional tail unit. It had a fixed tailwheel landing gear and room for two crew in tandem under a continuous canopy and was powered by a  Renault 4Pei engine. The production version designated the Monitor II was placed into production and first flew on 5 August 1955, it had all-metal wings and a Salmson-Argus engine. Production also took place in Belgium with Stampe et Renard under the designation SR.7B Monitor IV.

Variants
F.500 Monitor I
Prototype with a  Renault 4Pei or Renault 4Po-05 engine, of wooden construction, one built, first flown on 11 July 1952.
F.510 Monitor II
French production aircraft with a  Salmson 8As-04 engine, metal construction, one built, first flown on 5 August 1955.
F.520 Monitor III
Prototype Monitor I re-engined with a  Régnier 4L-02 engine, first flown on 15 June 1953.
F.521 Monitor III
with a  Régnier 4L-22 engine, one built.
SR.7B Monitor IV
Belgian production aircraft.

Specifications (Monitor II)

See also

References

Bibliography
 The Illustrated Encyclopedia of Aircraft (Part Work 1982–1985), 1985, Orbis Publishing, Page 1759

F.0500
1950s French civil trainer aircraft
Low-wing aircraft
Single-engined tractor aircraft
Aircraft first flown in 1952